Agyneta montana is a species of sheet weaver found in Ecuador. It was described by Millidge in 1991.

References

montana
Spiders described in 1991
Spiders of South America
Invertebrates of Ecuador